This is a list of futsal clubs in Brazil.

See also
 Futsal in Brazil

References
 Liga Futsal's official website
 Clubs at Futsal Brasil

External links
 Confederação Brasileira de Futebol de Salão

 
Futsal clubs